Francesco Trabucco (14 November 1944 – 14 March 2021) was an Italian architect and designer. He was a five-time winner of the Compasso d'Oro.

References

1944 births
2021 deaths
20th-century Italian architects
Italian designers